This article shows Vitória Sport Clube's player statistics and all matches that the club played during the 2017–18 season.

Players

Current squad
.

Pre-season and friendlies

Competitions

Supertaça Cândido de Oliveira

Primeira Liga

On 5 July 2017, Liga Portuguesa de Futebol Profissional announced nine stipulations for the Liga NOS fixture draw that took place on 7 July. Among previous conditions, two new were added, the two teams who will play the Supertaça could not play against Sporting CP (Portuguese team in the play-off round of Champions League) on the first two matchdays.

League table

Results by matchday

Matches

Taça de Portugal

Taça da Liga

Group C

UEFA Europa League

Group stage

References

External links
 Official club website 

Vitória S.C. seasons
Vitoria de Guimaraes
Vitoria de Guimaraes